Astolfo is a fictional character of the Matter of France where he is one of Charlemagne's paladins.

Astolfo may also refer to:

People
 Astolfo Petrazzi (1583–c. 1653), Italian Baroque painter
 Astolfo Romero (1950–2000), Venezuelan composer and musician
 Astolfo Romero (footballer) (born 1957), Colombian footballer
 Federica D'Astolfo (born 1966), Italian footballer
 Astolfo Cejundo and Astolfo Félix, injured in the 1984 San Ysidro McDonald's massacre
 Astolfo Gomes de Mello Araujo, winner of the 2008 Ig Nobel Prize in archaeology

Fiction
 Astolfo, in the Italian epic poem Orlando Furioso, as well as the operas based on it
 Astolfo, in the opera 1735 Alcina by George Frideric Handel
 Astolfo, in the 1636 Spanish play Life Is a Dream (La vida es sueño)
 Astolfo, in the 1960 Italian film Terror of the Red Mask
 Count Astolfo, in the 1962 Italian film The Prisoner of the Iron Mask
 Astolfo, in the 1985 Italian film La donna delle meraviglie (Woman of Wonders)
 Astolfo Granatum, in the 2015 Japanese manga series The Case Study of Vanitas
 Astolfo, a character in the light novel series Fate/Apocrypha

Places
 Astolfo Dutra, a municipality in Brazil

See also 
 Astolf (disambiguation)
 Aistulf, King of the Lombards
 Luigi Astolfi